Marshall Smith may refer to:

Marshall Smith (politician), Canadian politician and member of the Green Party of Canada
Marshall S. Smith, American educator
Dark Night Smith, American baseball player sometimes listed as Marshall Smith
Marshall–Smith syndrome, characterized by unusual accelerated skeletal maturation

Smith, Marshall